KDSR (101.1 FM, "101.1 Jack FM") is a Class C1 radio station licensed to serve Williston, North Dakota.  The station is owned by Marks Radio Group, and licensed to Williston Community Broadcasting Corp. (dba KDSR-FM). It airs an adult hits music format.

The station studios are at 910 E Broadway in Williston.

The station was assigned the KDSR call letters by the Federal Communications Commission on August 30, 1984.

Former branding

References

External links
Williston Community Broadcasting

DSR
Adult hits radio stations in the United States
Jack FM stations
Williston, North Dakota